Færvik is a village in Arendal municipality in Agder county, Norway. The village is located on the southwestern part of the island of Tromøy. It sits east of Pusnes and Brattekleiv and north of Revesand. Færvik Church is located just southwest of the village. Færvik was the administrative centre of the old Tromøy municipality from 1878 until 1992.

References

Villages in Agder
Arendal